Magisterial may refer to:
 pertaining to magistrate
 pertaining to magisterium